This is a list of steamboats and related vessels which operated on the Columbia river and its tributaries and in the state of Oregon, including its coastal areas.  This should not be considered a complete list.  Information for some vessels may be lacking, or sources may be in conflict.

This list summarizes basic characteristics of steamboats placed in service on the Columbia River and its tributaries. The articles Steamboats of the Columbia River, Steamboats of the Arrow Lakes, British Columbia, Steamboats of Columbia River, Wenatchee Reach, Steamboats of the Cowlitz River, and Steamboats of the Willamette River expand on the topic

Table codes key

Disposition codes
Disposition codes used in this list are:
 A = Abandoned.
 B = Burned
 C = Converted;  C-B = Converted to barge; C-D = converted to diesel engine; C-F = Converted to ferry; C-G = Converted to gasoline engine; C-H = Converted to house; C-S = converted to sailing vessel.
 D = Dismantled
 F = Foundered at sea;
 G = Grounded (total loss).
  L = Laid up.
 M = Museum as of 2017.
 N = Name change
 O = Operational as of date given.
 R = Rebuilt
 RN = Rebuilt and name changed.
 S = sank.
 T = Transferred; T-AK = Transferred to Alaska; T-BC = Transferred to British Columbia; T-CA = Transferred to California; T-WA = Transferred to Oregon or to Columbia River; T-GH = Transferred to Grays Harbor
 W = Wrecked by collision or striking ground;
 X = Explosion of boiler.

Vessel types
 Stern = sternwheeler
 Side = sidewheeler
 Prop = propeller-driven

Other abbreviations
 GT = Gross Tons; RT = Registered Tons.
 YB = Year Built
 Dspo = Disposition type
 Ldng = Landing
 Rpds = Rapids

Vessels should not be assumed to have served continuously in Oregon or on the Columbia river and its tributaries during the periods shown on this chart; transfer between service areas was common.

Gallery of vessel types

List of vessels

Name changes and notes

Name changes

Notes

References

Printed documents
 
 
 
 
 

 
 
 
 
 Goodwin, Helen Durrie, "Shipbuilding in the Northwest", The Washington Historical Quarterly, Vol. 11, No. 3 (Jul. 1920), pages 183-201 .
 

 
 
 
 
 
 Panter, William, "Early River Traffic on the Coquille", Glancing Back (Pioneer Lore), at 16-19, Vol. I, No. 1, Coos-Curry Pioneer and Historical Association (1971)

Government documents

See also

Museum vessels
 Moyie (sternwheeler) museum vessel in Kalso BC
 Naramata (steam tug) museum vessel in Penticton, BC
 Portland (sternwheeler) operational museum vessel in Portland, Oregon
 Sicamous (sternwheeler) museum vessel in Penticton, BC
 Virginia V, last operational wooden-hulled steamship on west coast, in Seattle, WA
 W.T. Preston (sternwheel snagboat), museum vessel in Anacortes, WA

Companies
 Canadian Pacific Railway Lake and River Service
 Ilwaco Railway and Navigation Company
 Oregon Steam Navigation Company
 Shaver Transportation Company

Other
 List of rapids of the Columbia River
 Shipwrecks of the Inland Columbia River
 Tourist sternwheelers of Oregon (replica steamboats in the 21st century)

 List
Oregon transportation-related lists
Columbia River
Columbia River
 List
Columbia River
Columbia River